Kaeso may refer to:

 Kaeso (praenomen) or Caeso (abbreviated K.), an ancient Roman naming convention 

Some of those who bore the name are:

Caeso Fabius Vibulanus (consul), consul 484, 481?, 479 BC
Caeso Quinctius, son of Lucius Quinctius Cincinnatus
Kaeso Duillius Longus, decemvir 450–449 BC

In fiction 
 Kaeso Fabius, character in 'Roma' by Steven Saylor, pp. 283-338

See also 
 Praenomen